This is a list of Moluccan people; people of Maluku Islands descent.

Activists

 Chris Soumokil, president of the self-proclaimed Republik Maluku Selatan
 Frans Tutuhatunewa, president in exile of the Republik Maluku Selatan
 Johan Manusama, president in exile of the Republik Maluku Selatan
 Johannes Leimena, former deputy prime minister of Indonesia
 Pattimura, Moluccan hero

Athletes
 Alfin Tuasalamony, football
 Bart Latuheru, football
 Bobby Petta, football
 Cayfano Latupeirissa, football
 Chris Limahelu, american football
 Christian Supusepa, football
 Denny Landzaat, football
 Massaro Glunder, kickboxing
 Dicky Palyama, badminton
 Diego Michiels, football
 Dominggus Lim-Duan, football
 Edinho Pattinama, football
 Eli Louhenapessy, football
 Elise Tamaëla, tennis
 Ellyas Pical, boxer
 Ferdinand Katipana, football
 Gaston Salasiwa, football
 Giovanni van Bronckhorst, football
 Hasyim Kipuw, football
 Ignacio Tuhuteru, football
 Ilham Armaiyn, football
 Jamarro Diks
 Jason Oost, football
 Jeffrey Leiwakabessy, football
 Jerry Taihuttu, football and trainer
 Joey Pelupessy
 Jordao Pattinama, football
 Jordy Tutuarima
 Jos Luhukay, football and trainer
 Justin Tahapary, football
 Kevin Diks
 Levi Risamasu, football
 Manahati Lestusen, football
 Michael Timisela, football
 Misha Latuhihin, volleyball
 Navarone Foor, football
 Rebecca Soumeru, softball
 Rexy Mainaky, badminton
 Richardo Salampessy, football
 Bellaetrix Manuputty, badminton
 Rizky Pora, football
 Rochy Putiray, football
 Sergio van Dijk, football
 Simon Tahamata, football
 Sonny Silooy, football
 Stefano Lilipaly, football
 Tobias Waisapy, football
 Tom Hiariej, football
 Ton Pattinama, football and trainer
 Xander Houtkoop, football
 Zulham Zamrun, football

Entertainers

 Cesqeaux, DJ
 Glenn Fredly, singer-songwriter 
 Melly Goeslaw, singer-songwriter (half Sundanese)
 Mohammad Ridwan Hafiedz, song script writer
 Carolyn Lilipaly, presenter
 Susanty Manuhutu, Puteri indonesia 1995, Miss Universe Indonesia 1995
 Eric Papilaya, singer
 Justine Pelmelay, singer
 Jonas Rivanno, actor and singer
 Ruth Sahanaya, pop singer
 Daniël Sahuleka, singer

See also
 List of Acehnese people
 List of Bugis people
 List of Chinese Indonesians
 List of Javanese people
 List of Sundanese people
 List of Batak people
 List of Minangkabau people

Moluccan
Moluccan